Melvin Claude Snyder (October 29, 1898 – August 5, 1972) was an American attorney and Republican politician who served as a United States representative from West Virginia. He was a member of the Eightieth Congress.

Born in Albright, Preston County, West Virginia, Snyder attended the public schools. During the First World War, he enlisted in the United States Army and served as a private in 1918. In 1923 he graduated from the West Virginia University Law School at Morgantown, West Virginia and was admitted to the bar the same year. He began his legal practice in Kingwood, West Virginia. He became the mayor of Kingwood in 1926. He served as prosecuting attorney for Preston County from 1929 to 1944.

He returned to the United States Army and served from January 6, 1941, until his discharge as a colonel on January 30, 1946. He then served as the director of Surplus Property for Division of Territories and Island Possessions, Department of Interior. In 1946 he was elected to the House as a Republican. His subsequent election campaigns were unsuccessful in 1948 and 1950.

After leaving the House, he served as a judge, eighteenth judicial circuit court, West Virginia from January 1, 1953, to October 1, 1971. He was a member of the West Virginia Judicial Council and was a president of the West Virginia Judicial Association. He died in Kingwood on August 5, 1972, and was buried in Maplewood Cemetery.

See also
United States congressional delegations from West Virginia

External Links
West Virginia & Regional History Center at West Virginia University, Melvin C. Snyder, Congressman, Papers

Sources

1898 births
1972 deaths
Military personnel from West Virginia
United States Army personnel of World War I
United States Army personnel of World War II
County prosecuting attorneys in West Virginia
People from Kingwood, West Virginia
United States Army officers
United States Army soldiers
United States Department of the Interior officials
West Virginia circuit court judges
West Virginia lawyers
West Virginia University College of Law alumni
Mayors of places in West Virginia
Republican Party members of the United States House of Representatives from West Virginia
20th-century American judges
20th-century American politicians
20th-century American lawyers